Adrenomedullin (ADM or AM) is a vasodilator peptide hormone of uncertain significance in human health and disease. It was initially isolated in 1993 from a pheochromocytoma, a tumor of the adrenal medulla: hence the name.

In humans ADM is encoded by the ADM gene. ADM is a peptide expressed by all tissues, and found in the circulation. A similar peptide named adreomedullin2 was reported in rats in 2004 which exhibits a similar function.

Function 
Adrenomedullin may function as a hormone in the circulation control because it is found in blood in a considerable concentration. It was initially identified as a vasodilator, and some argued that it is the most potent endogenous vasodilatory peptide found in the body.  Differences in opinion regarding the ability of AM to relax vascular tone may arise from the differences in the model system used.

Other effects of AM include stimulating the growth of new blood vessels (angiogenesis) and increasing the tolerance of cells to oxidative stress and hypoxic injury.  Adrenomedullin is seen as a positive influence in diseases such as hypertension, myocardial infarction, chronic obstructive pulmonary disease and other cardiovascular diseases, whereas it can be seen as a negative factor in potentiating the ability of cancerous cells to extend their blood supply and thereby enable further cell proliferation.

Peptide 

Adrenomedullin consists of 52 amino acids, has 1 intramolecular disulfide bond, and shows a slight homology with the calcitonin gene-related peptide (CGRP). The precursor, called preproadrenomedullin, consists of 185 amino acids and can be cleaved by plasma kallikrein at the Lys-Arg and Arg-Arg sites. By RNA-blot analysis, human adrenomedullin mRNA was found to be expressed in all tissues, and most highly expressed in the placenta, fat cells, lung, pancreatic islets, smooth muscle, and skin.

The human AM gene is localized to a single locus on Chromosome 11 with 4 exons and 3 introns.  The AM gene initially codes for a 185-amino acid precursor peptide, that can be differentially excised to form a number of peptides, including an inactive 53-amino acid AM, e PAMP, adrenotensin and AM95-146.  Mature human AM is activated to form a 52 amino acid, 6-amino acid ring, that shares moderate structural similarity to the calcitonin family of regulatory peptides (calcitonin, CGRP and amylin).  Circulating AM consists of both amidated active form (15%) and the glycated inactive form (85%).  It has a plasma half-life of 22min, mean clearance rate of 274 mL/kg/min, and apparent volume of distribution of 880 ± 150 mL/kg.

Receptors 

Adrenomedullin (AM) exerts its actions through combinations of the calcitonin receptor like receptor (CALCRL) or CLR; and either (Receptor activity-modifying protein)  2 (RAMP2) or RAMP3, (known as AM1 and AM2 receptors respectively). Both transduce the hormone binding to intracellular signaling via second messenger cascades.  The AM2 receptor has a low affinity for CGRP, but this is of no physiological relevance.  Unlike the classical one ligand-one receptor notion of receptor signalling, the interaction of both CALCRL and RAMP at the membrane is  required for AM to mediate its action: neither can bind the hormone (and therefore transduce a signal) alone. Stimulation by AM of its receptor increases production of both cyclic AMP (cAMP) and nitric oxide.

Before the discovery of the RAMPs and the identification of heteromeric receptors for the calcitonin family of peptides, a single G Protein coupled Adrenomedullin receptor was identified, but more recent reports have cast doubts as to its importance in the major effects of adrenomedullin.
In more recent research, the roles of the AM1 and AM2 receptors have been clarified through studies in genetically manipulated mice.  The adrenomedullin knockout is an embryonic lethal phenotype and dies mid gestation from a condition known as hydrops fetalis.  The CALCRL or CLR KO mouse recapitulates the same phenotype, as it lacks both the AM1 and AM2 receptors (incidentally confirming the lack of physiological significance for the earlier single protein AM receptor discovered by Kapas).  RAMP2 KO mice also recapitulates the same phenotype showing that major physiological effects of AM are transduced by the AM1 receptor.  Even the heterozygote RAMP 2 mice have disturbed physiology with unusual bone and mammary gland defects, and very aberrant endocrinology, leading to poor fertility and lactation problems.  What is very surprising is that the effect of deletion of RAMP3 has no deleterious effects and seems to confer advantages due to higher than normal bone mass, and reduced weight gain in older age.

References

Further reading

External links
 
 

Endocrinology
Genes on human chromosome 11